Florent Riancho (born 23 August 1989) is a French badminton player. In 2012, he won Miami International tournament in men's doubles event, then in 2014 he became the runner-up of Hatzor International tournament in mixed doubles event.

Achievements

BWF International Challenge/Series (4 titles, 1 runner-up) 
Men's doubles

Mixed doubles

  BWF International Challenge tournament
  BWF International Series tournament
  BWF Future Series tournament

References

External links 
 

1989 births
Living people
French male badminton players